The Rice River is a  tributary of the Mississippi River in northern Minnesota, United States.

The Rice River takes its name from the abundant wild rice that once fed Native Americans.

See also
List of rivers of Minnesota

References

External links
Minnesota Watersheds
USGS Hydrologic Unit Map - State of Minnesota (1974)

Rivers of Minnesota
Tributaries of the Mississippi River
Rivers of Aitkin County, Minnesota